Jefferson County School District R-1 (a.k.a. Jefferson County Public Schools or Jeffco Public Schools) is a school district in Jefferson County, Colorado. The district is headquartered at the Jeffco Public Schools Education Center in West Pleasant View, an unincorporated area of the county near Golden in the Denver metropolitan area. Jeffco Public Schools serves almost  81,000 students in 166 schools. It is the second-largest school district in Colorado, having been surpassed in 2013 by Denver Public Schools, which has an enrollment of approximately 81,000.

The district covers the entirety of Jefferson County, and also includes a section of Broomfield.

History

Beginnings

The first school in Jefferson County and the second school in Colorado opened in Golden on January 9, 1860. It stood at around today's 1304 Washington Avenue and was a rented log cabin, with school taught by Thomas Daughterty, with 18 students, financed through tuition and subscription. Its second term was taught by Miss M. F. Manly. When Jefferson County was organized by the Territorial government in 1861, the capability of organizing public schools became reality, and George West became the first superintendent of Jefferson County schools. After a mill levy was created in 1862, the first two school districts, Golden and Vasquez (roughly today's Wheat Ridge/Arvada area), were organized in 1863. That September the first public school in the county opened in Golden.

Original school districts

Over time, as the population grew and spread across the county, more and more school districts were organized, each with its own elected board to govern them. They were a diverse variety of schools, from the stately brick edifices of urban Golden which operated through the traditional school year, to the rural one-room wooden schoolhouses that operated during the summer months because winter in the mountains made it difficult for students to attend. Some school districts only rented buildings for class; others shared into neighboring counties. The first building constructed as a Jefferson County public school, around the area of 14th and Arapahoe Streets in Golden, was never completed and eventually sold in 1866 to Colorado Territorial Governor Alexander Cummings for $2,700 for use as the Territorial Executive Building. Its replacement, the first completed public school building in Jefferson County, still stands today at 1420 Washington Avenue in Golden. After the completion of its successor at today's 1314 Cheyenne Street in 1873, later known as the South School, Jefferson County's first senior high school, Golden High School, was organized. The first public school graduations in Jefferson County were held in the 1880s.

By 1894 Jefferson County school enrollment was around 1,500 students, with 54 high school students. By 1939 Jeffco had blossomed to 3,883 students with 1,426 high schoolers. In the early 20th century, however, population shifts and other factors began to spur consolidation. The Lorraine School District of Jefferson County merged with the Mandalay School District of Boulder County (Broomfield) in 1917. In 1920 the Montana, Lakeview, Midway and Mt. Carbon districts merged to become Bear Creek District C-1. In 1923 several mountain districts merged into Evergreen District C-2, while in 1945 Washington Heights and Bancroft merged to form School District 52. However, some school districts went by the wayside including South Platte in 1944, Pleasant Park in 1946, and Pine Grove. By 1950 only 39 of the 54 individually organized school districts remained.

List of historic school districts

Note: several districts have different identities over time.

 1 - Golden
 2 - Everett/Vasquez/Arvada
 3 - Mt. Vernon/Kittredge
 4 - Bergen/Creswell
 5 - Bear Creek/Mt. Carbon
 6 - Ralston/Fremont
 7 - Upper Ralston/Leyden
 8 - Vasquez/Wheat Ridge
 9 - Mt. Vernon/Bradford Junction/Conifer
 10 - Guy Hill
 11 - Platte/Spruce Park & Sprucedale
 12 - Ralston
 13 - Mountain/Rockland
 14 - Clear Creek/Maple Grove
 15 - Platte Canyon/Deer Creek
 16 - Bear Creek/Montana
 17 - Turkey Creek/Brownville/Medlen
 18 - Pine & Estabrook
 19 - Pleasant Park
 20 - Fairmount
 21 - Lakewood/Edgewater
 22 - Mt. Morrison
 23 - Lothrop
 24 - South Platte
 25 - Lorraine & Mandalay
 26 - Turkey Creek/Hodgson
 27 - Coal Creek Canyon/Columbine
 28 - Pine Grove
 29 - Belcher Hill
 30 - Buffalo Creek/Evergreen
 31 - Soda Creek
 32 - Fruitdale
 33 - Jefferson City/Plainview
 34 - Kassler
 35 - Urmston
 36 - Lamb
 37 - Lakeview
 38 - Parmelee Gulch
 39 - Semper
 40 - Buffalo Creek
 41 - Bancroft
 42 - Idledale
 43 - Wagner
 44 - Prospect Valley
 45 - Midway
 46 - Sampson
 47 - Lakewood - Stober Elementary
 48 - Daniels
 49 - Denver View
 50 - Washington Heights
 51 - Mountair
 52 - Washington Heights & Bancroft
 C-1 - Bear Creek Consolidated
 C-2 - Evergreen Consolidated

In 1950, the 39 school districts in Jefferson County were consolidated and reorganized into a single district, Jefferson County R-1 Schools. It was so named as the Reorganized School District 1, and ushered in a modern age in a county where some still sent to school in the original one-room rural schoolhouses. Through the course of time several landmark school buildings had been built across Jefferson County, including Golden's North, South, Central and High schools; the stone Morrison school; and Lakewood's 3-school campus. With renewed energy a new generation would be built, and state-of-the-art schools sprouted across Jefferson County as old schools were phased out. By 1999 Jefferson County had an enrollment of 88,793 students.

Today the next wave of school buildings is being created, as Jefferson County schools move forward into the 21st century. However, a good collection of schools from throughout Jeffco's educational history remain. They serve many uses from private homes to museums, and several are designated Jefferson County, Colorado and National Historic Register landmarks.

Through Jeffco schools' history, there have been several fatal events which have not been forgotten. In 1887 the original Lamb School, which had just been built the year before, burned down and had to be replaced. (The rebuilt school was later destroyed by the Lower North Fork Fire in 2012.) In 1905 Golden's South School, including Golden High School, was saved from explosion by janitor Oscar Nolin when its overheating boiler was minutes away from claiming possibly over 100 lives. In 1916 the original Fruitdale School burned as its students marched to safety. In 1919 an attempt to burn down the South School was made by a parent who was frantic to keep the school from reopening in the wake of the Great Flu Epidemic, but the fire smothered itself out. In 1938 the recently built Buffalo Creek School burned while school was in session from an overheated furnace, and teacher Wilma Barnes successfully got all 15 students to safety. On April 7, 1982, Scott Darwin Michael was shot and killed by classmate Jason Rocha at Deer Creek Middle School. In 1999, two students killed 12 students and a teacher in the Columbine High School massacre.

On February 23, 2010, eighth-graders Reagan Webber and Matt Thieu were shot and wounded at Deer Creek Middle School. The incident ended when math teacher David Benke tackled the perpetrator, Bruco Strong Eagle Eastwood, who was armed with a .30-06 Winchester Model 70.

In September 2014, students and teachers in schools around the district protested the conservative ideology of the school board, which had proposed reviewing the APUSH curriculum set by the College Board, to focus history education on citizenship and patriotism, while condemning civil disobedience and strike actions. The conservative members of the board were recalled and replaced in November 2015, on a 64-36 public vote.

Environmental consideration
Many Jefferson County schools make use of constructed wetlands for managing stormwater and contributing to the health of local watersheds. The wetland project at Oberon Middle School has been lauded by the National Resources Defense Council for setting "an example for local governments seeking new ways to manage stormwater on municipal grounds with some value added.

Literary mentions
Oberon Middle School is the setting for the novel Define "Normal" by Julie Anne Peters.

Schools
As of April, 2021 - there are currently 166 active schools in Jeffco Public Schools, as identified by Colorado Department of Education School ID numbers.

 95 elementary schools (grades PreK + PreK-5 + K-5)
 8 K-8 (grades PreK-8)
 20 middle schools (grades 6, 7, 8)
 4 middle + high schools (grades 6-12)
 22 high schools (grades 9, 10, 11, 12)
 7 PreK-12 (grades K-12 + PreK-12)
 11 option and alternative schools (various grades)
 20 charter schools (various grades)
 1 online school (grades 6-12)
 3 Career Technical Education schools (* Warren Tech South opening in Fall, 2021)
 2 Outdoor Lab Programs

Elementary schools

Middle/Junior high schools

Senior high schools

Option schools

Special schools and programs

Charter schools

Former schools
Columbia Heights Elementary School, Wheat Ridge (closed 1978)
Community Involved Charter School / Center for Discovery Learning Charter School (closed 2005)
Fruitdale School, Wheat Ridge (closed 1978)
Jefferson County Open High School (merged into Jefferson County Open School, 1989)
Martensen Elementary School (closed 2011)
Mountain Open High School, Evergreen (renamed Jefferson County Open High School, 1978)
Open Living School, Edgewater (combined into Tanglewood Open Living School in 1978)
Open Living School, Evergreen (combined into Tanglewood Open Living School in 1978) 
Pleasant View Elementary School, Golden (closed 2017)
Russell Elementary School, Arvada (closed 2010)
Tanglewood Elementary School, Golden (Closed 1978)Tanglewood Open Living School, Golden (merged into Jefferson County Open School, 1989)
Zerger Elementary School (closed 2011)
Washington Heights Elementary (closed in the 1990s, now a Community Art Center)                 Earl Johnson Elementary.  Located on Johnson Rd.  Demolished in the 1980's

Demographics
As of January, 2021

Enrollment count for 2020-2021 school year: 80,088

American Indian 0.5%
Asian 3%
Black 1%
Hispanic 25%
White 66%
Native Hawaiian / Pacific Islander 0.15%
Multiple races 4%

source: Colorado Department of Education Pupil Membership

Superintendents

 1997–2002 Jane Hammond
 2002–2014 Cindy Stevenson
 2014–2017 Dan McMinimee
 2017 (Mar–Jun) Terry Elliott (interim)
 2017–2020 Jason Glass
 2020–2021 Kristopher Schuh (interim)
 Tracy Dorland - started April 19, 2021

Footnotes

Further reading

 Nicky Woolf, "US 'Little Rebels' Protest against Changes to History Curriculum," The Guardian, Sept. 26, 2014.
 Lindsey Bever, "After Weeks of Student Protests, Colorado School Board Gives a Little Ground on ‘Positive’ History Curriculum," Washington Post, Oct. 3, 2014.
 Charles Lane, "What the AP U.S. History fight in Colorado is really about," Washington Post, Nov. 6, 2014.

External links

 
School districts in Colorado
Golden, Colorado
Education in Jefferson County, Colorado
Education in Broomfield, Colorado
School districts established in 1950
1950 establishments in Colorado